Yingjiang District is an urban district of and the easternmost county-level division of the city of Anqing, Anhui Province, People's Republic of China.

Administrative divisions
Yingjiang District has jurisdiction over six administrative subdistricts and four towns.

Renmin Road Subdistrict, Huazhong Road Subdistrict, Xiaosu Road Subdistrict, Yicheng Road Subdistrict, Xinhe Road Subdistrict, Jianshe Road Subdistrict

Towns
Changfeng, Xinzhou, Longshiqiao, Laofeng

County-level divisions of Anhui
Anqing